As a result of the first periodical review of Scottish Parliament (Holyrood) constituencies, new constituencies and additional member regions of the Scottish Parliament were introduced for the 2011 Scottish Parliament election. The D'Hondt method is used, as previously, in the allocation of additional member seats.

The Boundary Commission for Scotland began the review as announced on 3 July 2007, and provisional proposals were published on Thursday 14 February 2008.

The Scottish Parliament (Constituencies) Act 2004 required the commission to review boundaries of all constituencies except Orkney and Shetland (which cover, respectively, the Orkney Islands council area and the Shetland Islands council area) so that the area covered by the reviewed constituencies continues to be covered by a total of 71 constituencies.

The Orkney and Shetland constituencies were taken into account, however, in review of boundaries of the additional member regions.

Final recommendations followed public consultations and a series of local inquiries, and the terms of the 2004 act required final recommendations to be submitted in a report to the Secretary of State for Scotland not later than 30 June 2010.

Boundary changes 
For the purposes of the review the Boundary Commission for Scotland must take into account the boundaries of the local government council areas. In order to do this some council areas were grouped together, the largest of these groupings of provisional proposals consisted of four of Scotland's 32 council areas the smallest only containing one. Constituencies created in 1999 were based on Scottish Westminster constituencies that were created in 1997 and they in turn were based on the boundaries of local government regions and districts and islands areas that existed at the time, but since have been abolished and replaced with the council areas.

Following their proposal processes the Commission published their Final Recommendations. All the review processes were completed with the outlined constituencies below no longer due for alteration.

Constituencies

Electoral regions 

The Boundary Commission also recommended changes to the electoral regions used to elect "list" members of the Scottish Parliament. The recommendations can be summarised below;

Historical representation by party

Central Scotland

Glasgow

Highlands and Islands

Lothian / Lothians (1999–2011)

Mid Scotland and Fife

North East Scotland

South of Scotland / South Scotland (2011)

West of Scotland / West Scotland (2011)

References 

2011 in British politics
2011 in Scotland